Kan Thar Yar Lake (ကန်သာယာရေကန်) is the largest lake in Kayin State. The lake is a popular recreational area for tourists and a famous location for romance in popular culture. It is also famous for the Kantharyar Bridge that crosses it. It is located in the center of Hpa-an. Kan Thar Yar Lake is about 100 acres wide.

To attract local and foreign tourists, the Kayin State Government has built a new 12-foot-wide circuit, Zwekabin Park, and a children's playground, as well as waterfalls on the circuit of the lake. In April 2022, the Kayin State Government used 289 million Myanmar Kyats to build another pedestrian bridge over Kan Thar Yar Lake.

Sights of interest

References

Lakes of Myanmar
Geography of Kayin State
Tourist attractions in Myanmar